Marvin Nash (7 December 1953 – 20 January 2023) was a Canadian sprinter. He competed in the men's 100 metres at the 1976 Summer Olympics. He won a bronze medal in the 1975 Pan American Games 4 × 100 metres relay (with Hugh Fraser, Albin Dukowski, and Bob Martin).

References

External links
 Canadian Olympians
 

1953 births
2023 deaths
Athletes (track and field) at the 1976 Summer Olympics
Canadian male sprinters
Olympic track and field athletes of Canada
Athletes (track and field) at the 1975 Pan American Games
Athletes (track and field) at the 1979 Pan American Games
Pan American Games bronze medalists for Canada
Pan American Games medalists in athletics (track and field)
Athletes (track and field) at the 1978 Commonwealth Games
Commonwealth Games competitors for Canada
Black Canadian track and field athletes
Jamaican emigrants to Canada
Sportspeople from Kingston, Jamaica
Medalists at the 1975 Pan American Games
Universiade medalists in athletics (track and field)
Universiade silver medalists for Canada